Amlogic Inc. (sometimes stylized AMLogic) is a fabless semiconductor company that was founded on March 14, 1995 in Santa Clara, California and is predominantly focused on designing and selling system on a chip integrated circuits. Like most fabless companies in the industry, the company outsources the actual manufacturing of its chips to third-party independent chip manufacturers such as TSMC.  Its main target applications as of 2021 are entertainment devices such as Android TV-based devices and IPTV/OTT set-top boxes, media dongles, smart TVs and tablets.  It has offices in Shanghai, Shenzhen, Beijing, Xi'an, Chengdu, Hefei, Nanjing, Qingdao, Taipei, Hong Kong, Seoul, Mumbai, London, Munich, Indianapolis, Milan, Novi Sad and Santa Clara, California.

It developed Video CD player chips and later chips for DVD players and other applications involving MPEG2 decoding. Amlogic was involved in the creation of the HVD (High-Definition Versatile Disc) standard promoted in China as an alternative to DVD video disks used in DVD players. The company was a player in the developing Chinese tablet processor market since 2010–2013.

Amlogic is an ARM licensee and uses the ARM architecture in the majority of its products . According to a joint press release with ARM in 2013, it was the first company to use ARM's Mali-450 GPU in a configuration with six cores or more.

Products

Tablet computer SoC

AML8726 family 
 Amlogic AML8726-M Legacy single core ARM Cortex A9-based SoC with ARM Mali-400 GPU released in 2011, with a 16-bit DRAM interface and manufactured on a 65 nm process.
 Amlogic AML8726-M3 Legacy single-core ARM Cortex A9-based SoC with ARM Mali-400 GPU, released in 2012, with a 16-bit DRAM interface and manufactured on a 45 nm process.
 Amlogic MX (also known as AML8726-M6) Dual-core ARM Cortex A9-based SoC with ARM Mali-400 MP2 GPU, released in 2012 on a 40 nm process.

M8 family (announced 2013) 
 Amlogic M802 (originally called AML8726-M8) Quad-core ARM Cortex A9-based SoC with ARM Mali-450 MP6 GPU running at 600 MHz. Supports 4 GB DRAM and 4K2K display output. 64-bit DRAM interface, manufactured on a 28 nm HPM process.
 Amlogic M801 Similar to M802 but with DRAM limited to 2 GB and display output limited to 1080p.
 Amlogic M805 Quad-core ARM Cortex-A5-based SoC with Mali-450 MP2 GPU in a reduced-size 12 mm x 12 mm LFBGA package.

The M801/802 uses a new version of ARM's Cortex-A9 core (A9r4) that theoretically allows for higher clock speeds and lower power consumption compared to older versions of the Cortex A9 core such as the A9r3 used in Rockchip's RK3188.

Originally scheduled to be in production as early as the middle of 2013 in the form of the AML8726-M8, only one tablet (Onda V975M) has been announced using a chip from the M8 family.

A few manufacturers have shown Android TV boxes using the M802 (Shenzhen Tomato Technology, Tronsmart, Eny Technology and GeniaTech). It has been noted that some devices using the M802 may run hot and use a heatsink for cooling. This is common among other popular OTT set top boxes such as the Amazon FireTV which uses a metal shell to disperse heat, much like a heatsink would.

TV SoCs

Media player SoCs (S8 family) 
Amlogic also offers SoC products (S802, S805, and S812) specifically targeting Android TV boxes and OTT set-top boxes (which are variations of similar SoCs in the M series targeting tablets).

 Amlogic S802 Similar to M802, quad-core ARM Cortex-A9-based SoC with ARM Mali-450 MP6 GPU.
 Amlogic S805 A low cost SoC similar to M805 with quad-core ARM Cortex A5-based SoC with Mali-450 MP2 GPU running at 500 MHz, with hardware support for HEVC/H.265 decoding up to 1080p.
 Amlogic S812 Quad-core ARM Cortex-A9-based SoC with ARM Mali-450 MP6 GPU running at 600 MHz with hardware support for HEVC/H.265 decoding up to 4K.
S8**-H models include Dolby/DTS licenses.

Media player SoCs (S9 family) 

First 64-bit Amlogic Products lineup. On August 28, 2016, all members of the S9 family were reported to be internally limited to 1.5 GHz instead of the advertised 2.0 GHz clock rate.  As of that date, it was not clear if the limitation was due to hardware, firmware or software issues.

 Amlogic S905 Quad-core ARM Cortex-A53-based SoC with a Mali-450 MP3 GPU running at 750 MHz, supports hardware decoding up to 4K@60fps for multiple formats including H.265 10-bit, H.264, AVS+.
 Amlogic S905X Similar to S905 except it supports up to 4K@60fps VP9 profile-2 hardware decoding, HDR, HDMI 2.0a and having a built-in DAC.
 Amlogic S905L Similar to S905X except it supports HDMI 2.0b but lack VP9 decoding, camera interface and TS inputs.
 Amlogic S905D Similar to S905X except it supports DVP (Digital Video Port) interface.
 Amlogic S905W A low cost variant of the S905X, it supports video decoding only up to 4K@30fps.
 Amlogic S905Z Similar to S905X (VP9 hardware decoding, HDR, 4K@60fps ...), but no more details known about it, used in the third generation Amazon Fire TV and the Fire TV Cube.
 Amlogic S912 Octa-core ARM Cortex-A53-based SoC (Big.LITTLE configuration 4x1.5 GHz and 4x1.0 GHz) with a Mali-T820 MP3 GPU running at 600 MHz.
S9**(*)-H models include Dolby/DTS licenses.

 Amlogic S805X A low cost version of S905X SoC with 1.2 GHz quad-core ARM Cortex-A53-based SoC with a Mali-450 MP3 GPU, with hardware support for HEVC/H.265/VP9 decoding up to 1080p.

Devices based on them are already in the market running Android 5.1 to 7.1, they are usually paired with 1 GB, 2 GB or 3 GB RAM, 8 GB to 64 GB flash memory, they have features such as a Gigabit Lan and Dual band 2.4G/5G A/C WiFi.

S905X was scheduled to be released in Q1 2016 while S905D and S912 were scheduled for Q2 2016. All three of the SoCs have Android Marshmallow and Buildroot Linux SDKs released.

Media player SoCs (S9 family gen 2) 
At IBC 2018 Amlogic showed to the public for the first time their second generation SoCs for media players on reference boards running Android TV 9.

 Amlogic S905X2 Quad-core ARM Cortex-A53-based SoC with a Mali-G31 MP2 "Dvalin" GPU and adds to the first generation SoCs support to HDMI 2.1 at 4k60 and to the HDR formats of Dolby vision and TCH Prime.
 Amlogic S905Y2 Silmilar to the S905X2, built for smaller HDMI dongles and because of that it loses some features like Ethernet, DVP (Digital Video Port) interface, CVBS (Composite video).
 Amlogic S922X Quad-core ARM Cortex-A73+Dual-Core ARM Cortex-A53-based SoC with a Mali-G52 MP4 GPU.

Media player SoCs (S9 family gen 3) 
 Amlogic S905X3 quad core Cortex-A55 SoC. The S905X3 has an optional Neural Network Accelerator with 1.2 TOPS NN inference accelerator supporting TensorFlow and Caffe. Arm Mali G31 MP2 GPU with support for OpenGL ES 3.2, Vulkan 1.0 and OpenCL 2.0 support.
 Amlogic S922D Quad-core ARM Cortex-A73+Dual-Core ARM Cortex-A53-based SoC with a Mali-G52 MP4 GPU. The S922D has a Neural Network Accelerator with 2.5 TOPS (16-bit?) and 5.0 TOPS (8-bit?) NN inference accelerator supporting TensorFlow and Caffe.

Media player SoCs (S8 & S9 family gen 4) 
According to a leaked roadmap, Amlogic was to launch its next generation of media processors starting from Q4 2019. The main new feature is support of AV1 video decoding in hardware. Three new SoCs are in development:

 Amlogic S905X4 (Q4 2019): Mid-range SoC pin-compatible with S905X2 and -X3 processors. Adds 4k 120fps AV1 decoding.
 Amlogic S805X2 (Q2 2020): Low-end SoC with at least 1080p AV1 decoding. Quad-core ARM Cortex-A35 based SoC with Mali G31 MP2 GPU.
 Amlogic S908X (Q3 2020): High-end SoC with 8K 60fps AV1 and AVS3 decoding, HDMI 2.1 and unknown CPU and GPU.

Smart speakers and audio applications SoCs 
In Q3 2017 Amlogic released new SoCs targeting smart speakers and audio applications.
 Amlogic A111 Quad-core ARM Cortex-A5-based SoC,2-channel I2S input and output, TDM/PCM input and output, up to 8 channels, S/PDIF output, ethernet 100M and RGB888 output
 Amlogic A112 Quad-core ARM Cortex-A53-based SoC, 8-channel I2S and S/PDIF input and output, TDM/PCM input and output, up to 8 channels, 2-channel PDM input, ethernet 1Gig and LVDS/MIPI-DSI panel output
 Amlogic A113 Similar to A112 except it support 16 I2S channels, 8 PDM channels.                                                                                            

 Amlogic A311X Support 2ch sensor input maximum 8M pixel ISP. Neural Network Accelerator up to 5 Tops. Quad core ARM Cortex-A73 and dual core ARM Cortex-A53 high performance CPU architecture. Low latency 1080p H.265/H.264 60fps encoder. USB3.0/PCIE High speed data interface. Power management auxiliary processor.
 Amlogic A311D Hexa-core SoC featuring 4x ARM Cortex-A73 cores and 2 ARM Cortex-A53 cores. The GPU would be a 4-core Mali-G52 ARM with support for Vulkan 1.1, OpenGL 3.2 and OpenCL 2.2. It also has a Neural Processing Unit (NPU) for AI inference. The VPU supports 4K2K@60 Hz with CEC, HDR and 4K decoding h.265, VP9 and AVS2.

Smart Vision series SoCs 
 Amlogic C308X quad core Cortex-A55 SoC. Dual-core HiFi-4 Acoustic/Audio DSP. It also has a Neural Processing Unit (NPU) for AI inference. The VPU supports 4K@30fps + 1080P@30fps .
 Amlogic C305X Neural Processing Unit (NPU) for AI inference. Dual core Cortex-A35 SoC. The VPU supports 5M@30fps + 1080P@30fps .

Wireless Connectivity series products 
 Amlogic W155S1 Amlogic W155S1 is an integrated Wi-Fi and Bluetooth combo chip. It has a host interface of SDIO3.0 for Wi-Fi and UART HS for Bluetooth. Wi-Fi is designed to be fully compliant with IEEE 802.11ac standard and operated at both 2.4 GHz and 5 GHz band. It can support up-to 80 MHz bandwidth and PHY data rate of 433Mbps. Located in the same die is the Bluetooth system that can support both Classic BDR/EDR and BLE mode.

Automotive Electronics series products 
 Amlogic V901D 64-bit quad core ARM Cortex-A55 CPU, ARM Mali-G31 MP2 GPU processor, Neural Network Processor up to 1 Tops, HIFI 4 DSP for ultra-low power far-field voice, Automotive AEC-Q100 grade 3, HW UHD 4K AV1/H.265/VP9 10-bit video decoder, DolbyVision, HDR10/10+, HLG, Prime HDR, HDMI 2.1 receivers with dynamic HDR, ALLM, eARC and HDCP 1.4/2.2/2.3 support, PDM/I2S/TDM interface for far-field voice.

Other products 
The Amlogic MX, S802 and S805 SoCs are also targeted at media dongles.

Amlogic also offers SoCs targeting smart TVs and projectors, including M6L, M6C, M6D, M948, T826, T828, T866, T868, T962, T966 and T968.

Comparison table

Markets and sales 

Amlogic does not publish sales or financial information on its website.

The company is listed as a client of several venture capital firms.

In the market for SoCs targeting Chinese tablet manufacturers and manufacturers of Android media players, TV boxes and media dongles, it faces competition primarily from Rockchip, Allwinner Technology, Actions Semiconductor, MediaTek, Intel and Realtek. Amlogic was reported to be fourth largest application processor supplier for Chinese tablets in 2012. For Q2 2014, Amlogic was reported to be the fifth largest supplier, after Rockchip, MediaTek, Allwinner and Actions Semiconductor.
Chinese SoC suppliers that do not have cellular baseband technology are at a disadvantage compared to companies such as MediaTek that also supply the smartphone market as white-box tablet makers increasingly add phone functionality to their products.

In 2011, the AML8726-M was selected as one of the "hottest" processors by EE Times China, while in 2012, the AML8726-MX won EE Times-China's Processor of the Year award.

Open source commitment 

Amlogic maintains a website dedicated to providing source code for the Linux kernel and Android SDK supporting Amlogic chips and reference designs. The Linux kernel source code is freely available, and has recently (as of April 2014) been updated to support certain chips in the M8 family as well as the older MX family, with Android versions up to 4.4 (KitKat) being supported (based on Linux kernel version 3.10.x). However, the Android SDK requires a NDA and is only available to business partners. The source code includes Linux kernel 3.10.10, U-Boot, Realtek and Broadcom Wi-Fi drivers, NAND drivers, "TVIN" drivers, and kernel space GPU drivers for the Mali-400/450 GPU. XBMC/Kodi Amlogic S805 / M805 / S806 / M806 / S812 Android video decoding compatibility list: Android hardware - Official Kodi Wiki

However an effort to push Linux upstream support for the GX ARM64 lineup is ongoing on Linux for Amlogic — Linux for Amlogic Meson https://gitlab.com/pages/sphinx documentation. Currently only the AML8726MX, S802, S805 and S905 SoC are booting headless on Linux 4.8. But S905X, S905D and S912 Headless support is expected for Linux 4.10.

See also 
 Allwinner Technology
 Actions Semiconductor
 Broadcom
 Leadcore Technology
 MediaTek
 Nufront
 Realtek
 Rockchip
 UNISOC

References

1995 establishments in California
Technology companies established in 1995
ARM architecture
Embedded microprocessors
System on a chip
Fabless semiconductor companies
Semiconductor companies of the United States
Companies based in Santa Clara, California
Technology companies based in the San Francisco Bay Area